Cerotic acid, or hexacosanoic acid, is a 26-carbon long-chain saturated fatty acid with the chemical formula .  It is most commonly found in beeswax and carnauba wax. It is a white solid, although impure samples appear yellowish.

The name is derived from the Latin word cerotus, which in turn was derived from the Ancient Greek word κηρός (keros), meaning beeswax or honeycomb.

Cerotic acid is also a type of very long chain fatty acid that is often associated with the disease adrenoleukodystrophy, which involves the excessive saturation of unmetabolized fatty acid chains, including cerotic acid, in the peroxisome.

See also
List of saturated fatty acids
Very long chain fatty acids

References

Fatty acids
Alkanoic acids